Pancratium zeylanicum, commonly known as the Javanese lily is a bulbous perennial herb native to Borneo, Java, the Maluku Islands, Sulawesi, India, Sri Lanka, the Maldives, the Laccadive Islands, and the Philippines.

It is sometimes grown as a hothouse container plant.  It does not have a rest period unless water is withheld. It propagates by producing offsets and seed.

The pollinator is a moth with a very long proboscis. Flowers are white with narrow tepals and long teeth along the margin of the staminal corona.

References

zeylanicum
Flora of the Indian subcontinent
Flora of Malesia
Plants described in 1753
Taxa named by Carl Linnaeus